Vinokur is an East Slavic-language occupational surname. The word "винокур" is an archaic name of the profession of spirit distilling. 

The name may also be transliterated via German/Yiddish as Winokur or via French as Vinocour or Winocour.

People

Vinokur
 Grigoriy Vinokur (1896–1947), Russian linguist
 Ion Vinokur (1930–2006), Ukrainian archaeologist
 Jeffrey Vinokur (born 1990), American science educator and performer
 Tania Vinokur (born 1982), Israeli violinist
 Vladimir Vinokur (born 1948), Russian actor and comedian

Other forms
 Alice Winocour (born 1976), French screenwriter and director
 Lev Vinocour (born 1970), Russian pianist
 Valerii Vinokour (born 1949), Russian-American scientist
 Yaroslav Vynokur (born 1974), billiards player

See also
 
Vinokurov

Russian-language surnames
Ukrainian-language surnames
Occupational surnames